Pornsak Prajakwit (born 14 January 1982), better known mononymously as Pornsak, is a Singapore based Thai-Chinese actor who is a contracted artiste under Left Profile. He is fluent in Mandarin, Teochew, Cantonese, Bahasa Melayu, English and Thai.

Pornsak has won multiple awards at the Star Awards, Singapore's most prestigious entertainment award ceremony, including Best Variety Show Host in 2015 and Top 10 Most Popular Male Artiste Award nine times. From 2015 to 2017, he was voted Reader’s Digest Most Trusted Entertainer in Asia, as part of the Reader’s Digest Trusted Brand Survey.

Early life and education
Pornsak was born in 1982 in Sathon District, Bangkok, Thailand to a mainland Chinese father and a Thai-Chinese mother. Pornsak's mother died when he was five years old. Shortly afterwards, his father sent him to Singapore where he studied at Northlight School, Clementi Town Secondary School and Jurong Junior College. During his early years, he reportedly suffered from a language impediment. In 2004, Pornsak graduated with Bachelor of Business Management from Singapore Management University. Pornsak attended Monash University, where he read for a master's degree in Early Childhood Education. In June 2015, he obtained his bachelor's degree in Traditional Chinese Medicine (TCM) from Guangzhou University of Chinese Medicine.

Career
Pornsak won a competition run by Singapore Press Holdings radio station UFM 1003 and joined them as a full-time radio deejay. He started as a television host at Mediacorp in 2007.

Pornsak has hosted many different genres of shows. In 2007, he won the title of Best Newcomer at the Star Awards. He subsequently was voted to the "Top 10 Most Popular Artiste" and won the "Coolest Rocket Award". Pornsak co-owns a Thai restaurant, Porn's Sexy Thai Food and founded an education lab for young children. In  December 2016, his restaurant had been taken over by Jus Delish Group with the stake of 69%.

In 2017, he was invited by CCTV, China's national broadcaster, to make a special appearance in their international debate competition programme.

Pornsak has gotten 9 out of 10 Top 10 Most Popular Male Artistes from 2009, 2011, 2013-2015, 2017-2019, 2021 respectively.

In September 2020, Pornsak co-founded the livestreaming e-commerce platform Mdada with celebrity hairstylist Addy Lee and actress Michelle Chia. Pornsak left the company in January 2023 due to cited differences with his co-founders. 

Pornsak left Mediacorp on 31 January 2021, and joined Michelle Chong's artiste management agency, Left Profile.

Awards and nominations

References

External links
 

Living people
Singaporean television personalities
Pornsak Prajakwit
Singapore Management University alumni
Monash University alumni
1982 births